Opisuchus is an extinct genus of metriorhynchoid crocodyliform known from the Middle Jurassic Opalinuston Formation of Germany. It contains a single species, O. meieri.

References 

Middle Jurassic crocodylomorphs
Fossil taxa described in 2019
Fossils of Germany